Nachaba tryphaenalis is a species of snout moth in the genus Nachaba. It was described by Cajetan Felder, Rudolf Felder and Alois Friedrich Rogenhofer in 1875, and is known from Amazonas, Brazil.

References

Moths described in 1875
Chrysauginae